Ugaritic is a Unicode block containing cuneiform alphabetic characters for writing the Ugaritic and Hurrian languages of the Ugarit city-state from the 15th-12th centuries BCE.

Some of the Unicode character names are reconstructions, and as such are not found in Ugaritic source texts.

History
The following Unicode-related documents record the purpose and process of defining specific characters in the Ugaritic block:

References 

Unicode blocks